Corticea is a genus of skippers in the family Hesperiidae.

Species
Recognised species in the genus Corticea include:
 Corticea corticea (Plötz, 1883)
 Corticea graziellae (E. Bell, 1959)
 Corticea lysias Plötz, 1883
 Corticea mendica (Mabille, 1897) 
 Corticea schwarzi (E. Bell, 1941)
 Corticea similea (E. Bell, 1941)
 Corticea sylva (E. Bell, 1942)
 Corticea vicinus (Plötz, 1884)

References

Natural History Museum Lepidoptera genus database

Hesperiinae
Hesperiidae genera